Mercouri Kanatzidis (born 1957) is a Charles E. and Emma H. Morrison Professor of chemistry and professor of materials science and engineering at Northwestern University  and Senior Scientist at Argonne National Laboratory.

Kanatzidis was listed as one of the most cited researchers in Materials Science and Engineering in 2016 based on Elsevier Scopus data. He has published over 1,535 manuscripts (ISI h-index =161 Google h-index =178]) and has over 40 patents. As of March 2021, Mercouri Kanatzidis has mentored over 70 Ph.D. students and nearly 120 postdoctoral fellows. More than 90 of these alumni hold academic positions worldwide.

Early life and education
Kanatzidis was born in Thessaloniki, Greece. He received his B.S. degree from Aristotle University in 1979 and his Ph.D. from the University of Iowa in 1984  (with Dimitri Coucouvanis). He spent two years at the University of Iowa from 1980 to 1982 and then moved to the University of Michigan when Coucouvanis moved there in 1982.

He was a Postdoctoral Research Fellow at the University of Michigan (1985) and Northwestern University (1986-1987) where he worked with Professor Tobin J. Marks on conductive polymers and intercalation compounds.

He became assistant professor at Michigan State University in 1987. He was promoted to full Professor in 1994. He moved to Northwestern University in 2006.

Research
Kanatzidis has developed synthesis methodologies including the panoramic synthesis approach for the design and discovery of new chalcogenide materials and intermetallics.  He is known for the development of flux synthesis techniques which allow reactions to proceed at lower temperatures than otherwise would and can lead to new structures and compositions.  From his research, metal sulfide ion-exchangers have been discovered, which can be used in the heavy metal remediation of industrial waste water.

Kanatzidis invented strategies for achieving "nanostructuring" and all-scale architecturing for thermoelectric semiconductors, leading to high performance materials with record high ZT figures of merit.,  (ZT~2.2). Nanostructured thermoelectric materials possess coherently embedded nanodots, for example PbTe (a state called endotaxy) which lower the thermal conductivity by >70% while allowing high electrical conductivity, enabling very high ZT of >2.5.
Kanatzidis, along with fellow researcher Professor Robert P.H. Chang at Northwestern, developed a new solar cell that uses tin instead of lead perovskite. They published the first solid state solar cell device using a film of CsSnI3  perovskite CsSnI3 in a solid state dye-sensitized  Gratzel cell with ~10% efficiency.  He was first to demonstrate functioning CH3NH3SnI3 based solar cells.  He also demonstrated first CH3NH3SnI3 based solar cells and discovered the anomalous bandgap dependence between lead and tin based solid solutions APb1-xSnxI3 (A=Cs, CH3NH3, formamidinium) that revealed bandgaps as allow as 1.1 eV are achievable which is useful in development of tandem solar cells.

In 2016 Kanatzidis and Mohite showed that 2D iodide perovskites form films with vertical slab orientation and demonstrating >12% efficiency in a solar cell with far better stability than corresponding 3D MAPbI3-based solar cells. 2D iodide perovskites are now widely used as mixtures of 2D/3D perovskites for solar cells exhibit both high stability efficiency.

In 2013 he reported the x-ray detecting properties of the perovskite CsPbBr3 semiconductor  with potential applications in gamma-ray spectroscopy having better than 1.4% energy resolution.

Kanatzidis has proposed ideas and concepts for predictive synthesis to new materials including "infinitely adaptive" homologous superseries and the panoramic synthesis strategy where with a single experiment all phases in the course of a given reaction can be detected. This offers a panoramic view of all the phases present, and could help unravel the mechanisms of how new materials form.

Kanatzidis invented a new class of materials called chalcogels. These are unique inorganic compounds that are aerogels. Using ligand metathesis chemistry, he reported experimental conditions suitable to create gels and avoid the undesirable precipitates. The chalcogels are built like a sponge, and can soak up many heavy-metal atoms from polluted water. And because the chalcogels pack an enormous surface area into a tiny volume, small pieces can clear out thousands of liters of water. For example, the chalcogels reduce mercury, lead and cadmium concentrations down to ppt levels.  Biomimetic chalcogels containing Fe4S4 clusters were reported to reduce photochemically N2 to NH3.

Awards and honors
2022 - Global Energy Prize
2021 - Clarivate Highly Cited Researcher since 2015 (in three different disciplines: chemistry, physics, and materials science)
2019 - DOE Ten at Ten Scientific Ideas Award for the first demonstration of all-solid-state solar cells using halide perovskite materials.
2018 - American Institute of Chemistry Chemical Pioneer Award 
2017 - Hershel and Hilda Rich Visiting Professorship, Technion – Israel Institute of Technology 
2017 - University of Crete - Honorary Doctorate Degree
2016 - Samson Prime Minister's Prize for Innovation in Alternative Fuels for Transportation
2016 – American Physical Society (APS) Fellow  
2016 - APS James C. McGroddy Prize for New Materials
2016 – American Chemical Society (ACS) Award in Inorganic Chemistry 
2015 - ENI Award for the "Renewable Energy Prize" category
2015 - Awarded Wilhelm Manchot Professorship, Technical University of Munich
2015 - Elected Fellow of the Royal Chemical Society
2015 - Royal Chemical Society De Gennes Prize  
2014 – Materials Research Society (MRS) Medal
2014 - International Thermoelectric Society Outstanding Achievement Award
2014 - Einstein Professor, Chinese Academy of Sciences  
2013 - Cheetham Lecturer Award, University of California Santa Barbara
2012 - American Association for the Advancement of Science (AAAS) Fellow
2010 - MRS Fellow 
2006 - Charles E. and Emma H. Morrison Professor, Northwestern University
2003 - Morley Medal, American Chemical Society, Cleveland Section 
2003 - Alexander von Humboldt Prize
2002 - John Simon Guggenheim Foundation Fellow
2001 - University Distinguished Professor MSU
2000 - Sigma Xi Senior Meritorious Faculty Award
1998 - Michigan State University Distinguished Faculty Award
1993-1998 - Camille and Henry Dreyfus Teacher Scholar
1991-1993 - Alfred P. Sloan Fellow (see Sloan Fellows) 
1992-1994 - Beckman Young Investigator
1990 - ACS Inorganic Chemistry Division Award, EXXON Faculty Fellowship in Solid State Chemistry
1989-1994 - Presidential Young Investigator Award, National Science Foundation

References

External links
Northwestern University Chemistry Department
Kanatzidis Research Group 
Argonne National Laboratory Material Sciences Division 

1957 births
Living people
21st-century American chemists
Northwestern University faculty
Aristotle University of Thessaloniki alumni
University of Iowa alumni
University of Michigan fellows
Greek emigrants to the United States
Fellows of the American Physical Society
Scientists from Thessaloniki
Solid state chemists